The Battle of Lumë, also referred by the Albanians as the Uprising of Lumë (Kryengritja e Lumës), was a series of clashes between the Albanian locals of the region of Lumë in Ottoman Albania against the invading Serbian army in 1912 during the First Balkan War period. The Serbians sought access to the Adriatic Sea but against predictions were defeated by the Albanian forces. As a result, Serbia's advancement to the west was delayed, which contributed to the safety of the independence of Albania on 28 November 1912.

Beginning 
During the second half of October 1912, the Serbian army continued to occupy numerous Albanian regions, including Kosovo and elsewhere in the provinces of Lumë, Opoja, Vërrin, Gora, Has, Dibra, etc. Several battalions of the Third Army, exhausted from the battles in the internal part of Kosovo, entered Lumë. 

The Albanians organized numerous local assemblies as instructed by the "Shpëtimi" (Salvation) Committee, which held a meeting in Skopje on 14 October 1912. A decision to confront the advancement of the Serbian army was made. In the first week of November, after the Third Army captured Kosovo and the region of Dukagjin, it aimed to conquer northern and middle Albania in order to reach the shores of the Adriatic Sea. 

Since 5 November 1912, the Serbian General Božidar Janković entered Prizren with the regiments "Šumadija 1" for the operations to the Adriatic. To realize this plan, the Serbian army had created two separate units, which were named "Units of the coast" and the departments of these units were selected from the divisions "Šumadija" and "Drina" which were deployed in Prizren and Gjakova. Several paramilitary units preceded the expedition entering Lumë first, with their number going from 70 to 200, according to Jaša Tomić's book Rat u Albaniji pod Skadrom ('War in Albania and around Shkodra') of 1913. 

The size of the Serbian force is subject to debate. The 16,000 figure is mostly folkloric, and serves mostly for supporting the other folkloric number of 12,000 casualties. Sixteen thousand coincides to two groupings formed with "Šumadija 1" and "Drina" units, which hurried to reach the Adriatic from the right side of the White Drin. These fractions were engaged only partially in the combat, and missed the 15–17 and 18 November clashes of the second phase of the battle (13–18 November). During this phase, the number of Serbian soldiers and officers increased to 4,200, according to Serbian military reports, versus around 3,000 Albanians. The third phase of the war (18 November – 6 December) saw the involvement of the remainder of the "Šumadija 1" division, approximately 14,000, support by artillery personnel of 3,600. Including the second phase battalions which were severely damaged, the total number of the Serbian force equaled 21,800, excluding the paramilitary units. Elsie rounds the number to 20,000.

To avoid any risks to the coastal units in the Drin Valley in Lumë, the Serbian army invaded the Lumë region and the provinces of Has, Vërrin, Opoja-Gora and ruthlessly struck down all resistance in order to disarm the Albanians. Faced with the invading Serb army, thousands of Albanian fighters from Lumë, Has, Vërrin, and Opojan Gora along with Albanians from Kosovo, began fighting the Serb army. In this case the highlands of Paštrik (where the provinces of Has and the Gjakova highlands lay), the Šar Mountains (Gjalicë, Pikllimes, Koretnik) became a natural fortresses for the Albanians. Given the geo-strategic position, Albanian troops were deployed fronting the Highland of Gjakova, Has, Qafe Zhur, Sharr, and Opoja. The organizations of the Albanian resistance were led by Baftjar Doda, Xhafer Doda, Ramadan Zaskoci, Ramadan Cejku, Isjan Lika, Islam Spahija, Elez Isufi, Hoxha Mehmedi, Osman Lita, Cen Daci, Bajram Gjana, Jemin Gjana, Dervish Bajraktari, Muhtar Nika, Necip Bilali, Sylë Elezi, Ahmet Qehaja, and others.

Events 
Given the geo-strategic position, the Albanian troops were deployed fronting: Gjakova highland (Qafë Morinë - Qafë Prush); Has (Planejë - Gorozhup); Qafë Zhur; Vërri (Billushë - Jeshkovë - Lybeqevë - Lez); Sharr (Gur i Zi); and Opojë (Llapushnik gorge). The organizations of the Albanian resistance were done by Ramadan Zaskoci, Ramadan Çejku, Qazim Lika, Islam Sali Spahija, Hoxhe Mehmed, Osman Lita, Cen Daci, Bajram Things, Dervish Nezir Bajraktari, Muhtar Nika, Nexhip Aga Bilali, Sylë Elezi, Ahmet Ilaz Qehaja, Jemin Gjana, Elez Isufi, Suf Xhelili, Baftjar Doda and Xhafer Doda from Tejmalla, Diber, Bajram Curri from Gjakova highland, Sali Bajraktari from Has, Sheh Hasan Prizreni, Jahja Sait Sahiti from Kuki of Opoja, Kapllan Opoja, Nail Hyseni, Dani Rapça, Esat Berisha, Abdul Osmani, and Arif Krusa.

To prevent the Serbian troops from crossing to the other side of White Drin, the Albanians organized an ambush in the villages of Shalqin, Domaj, and Gjinaj. The Lumë forces numbered approximately 4,000 people, while the Dibra forces totaled about 600.

Result 

The Lumë Albanians captured the Tower of Lumë in bloody fighting, earning the victory of this battle. Albanian forces in the evening 17 November, attacked the carriages of the Serbian convoy attempting to withdraw in the direction of Prizren. During these fights, the Serbians lost many soldiers and materials. The fighting in the mountains was described in the memoirs of Kosta Novaković, a Serbian soldier who participated in the battle.
He wrote:

The success achieved during this fighting highlighted the skills of the Albanian guerrillas, who were victorious although inferior in forces and armament.

Casualties 
Calculation of the number of casualties is difficult since the primary sources of the battle were contradictory. Serbian military reports spoke of "several hundreds", the same description given by Kosta Novaković. The Serbian historians later estimated the number to be 198 killed and 31 wounded. The narrative stories of the Lumë highlanders place the number as high as 16,000 or even up to 18,000, much more than the 12,000 which commonly circulates and is also used on the Albania memorial dedicated to the battle.

An Ottoman telegram sent from Ohrid to Elbasan, dated 20 November 1912, reported that three officers and an "uncountable" number of soldiers, with around 1,000 rifles were captured by the Albanians. Another telegram, dating 2 December, sent from Aqif Pasha Elbasani to Ahmet bey Zogolli, mentions that the Serbians lost six battalions. The British consulate in Skopje reported in late February 1913 that they had lost eight battalions. Sali Onuzi places the number around 2,000 based on second phase (13–18 November) reports from the Ottomans of over 1,000. This excludes the potential losses associated with the paramilitary units. Albanians reported only 109 casualties.

Afterwards 

General Janković ordered the annihilation of the Lumë tribe where the Serbian army massacred an entire population of men, women and children and burned 27 villages in the region. Following the Serbian offensives of 1912–1913, Lumë was the area that experienced one of the greatest atrocities committed against the Albanians. The Lumë tribe was decimated and practically driven from existence. Women and children were tied to bundles of hay and set on fire before the eyes of their husbands and fathers. The women were then barbarously cut to pieces and the children bayoneted.

Leon Trotsky collected reports during the period and mentioned in his report: "It is all so inconceivable, and yet it is true!" Four hundred men from Lumë who gave themselves up voluntarily were taken to Prizren and executed day after day in groups of forty to sixty.

In connection with the news report it was reported that 300 unarmed Albanians of the Lumë tribe were executed in Prizren without trial. Regular Serbian troops committed the massacres but there was no doubt whatsoever that even the heinous massacres committed by irregulars were carried out with the tacit approval and in full compliance with the will of the Serbian authorities. At the beginning of the war, the Serbian officials stated that "we are going to wipe out the Albanians." Despite European protests, this systematic policy of extermination continued unhindered.

Importance 

The Battle of Lumë ended on the morning of 18 November 1912, with Albanian forces prevailing against the third Serbian army. The battle of Lumë, together with other events such as the battle of Monastir and Ottoman resistance in key city of Shkodër in the north-west and Yannina in the south threatened the decisions of the National Assembly in Vlora. The later led to the Albanian proclamation of independence from the Ottoman Empire on 28 November 1912. Specifically the battle of Lumë secured the central Albania Adriatic coast, permitting Ismail Qemali and other Albanian representatives to disembark in Durres since Vlore was threatened by Greek forces, who had already landed in Himara.

See also
Serbian campaign
Great Retreat (Serbian)

Notes

Citations

References

External links
 "Red Luma: A Martyr"

Serbian–Albanian conflict
Ottoman Albania
Ottoman period in the history of Kosovo
1912 in Albania
1912 in Kosovo
Battles involving Albania
Battles of the First Balkan War
Military history of Albania
October 1912 events
November 1912 events
December 1912 events
Mass murder in 1912